The NAPE Foundation is a 501(c)3 non-profit which is actively supporting disadvantaged students in Ghana.  NAPE is an acronym for Naa Amerley Palm Education.  The foundation was started in 2006 by Peter Carlos Okantey, a citizen of Ghana.  The foundation is a recognized  non-profit in Ghana, West Africa (by the Registrar General's and Ghanaian IRS) and United States of America (The State of Oregon and the USA IRS) and supported by individuals, Churches and corporations around the world.

The foundation provides a facility in Accra, Ghana for students to access computers and personal assistance in completing their college degree.  Since 2009, the NAPE Foundation has awarded scholarships to both high school, college and university students in Ghana. The NAPE Foundation is currently developing a new university in Ghana.

Past and current work in supporting students in Ghana
Since 2006 NAPE Foundation has offered scholarships to students in the Ghanaian higher education system. Some of the schools where students have received scholarships include, the University of Ghana, Valley View University, Ashesi University College and the Regent University College of Science and Technology.

NAPE Foundation has also supported secondary students in Nafana Presbyterian Senior High School in Sampa, in the Brong Ahafo region of Ghana as well as the Ghana Senior High School Tamale in the Northern Region of Ghana.

Future plans for higher education in Ghana
The NAPE Foundation is in the process developing a four-year, Christian liberal arts university in Ghana. The foundation is in the process of starting the accreditation process through the Ghana Ministry of Education's National Accreditation Board.

Current education system in Ghana
The education system in Ghana consists of primary and tertiary education. Beginning levels of education in Ghana consist of pre-primary and primary education, then Junior Secondary Schools. After the primary level students take an examination that is an entryway into the secondary and tertiary levels of education in Ghana.
The tertiary level of education in Ghana culminates in taking another examination, the WASSCE.

Mission
The mission of NAPE Foundation is to increase the availability of higher educational opportunities for Ghanaians.

Vision
Its vision is to provide higher educational opportunities to Ghanaians within a framework that nurtures leadership and embraces sound principles, ethics, and values in order to promote a more just and sustainable future.

Core values
Every individual has the potential to achieve success, given equal opportunities and resources
Higher education can be a catalyst for developing human capacity and transforming society
Higher education is the vehicle for developing leaders and communities;
Higher Education should promote inter-generational thinking and an awareness of the interconnectedness and interdependence of people and their environment;
Higher education should be accessible to all Ghanaians
Access to higher education will bring hope for a just and sustainable future to Ghanaians and other Africans.

Leadership

Board of trustees

Advisory board

References

Foreign charities operating in Ghana
Education in Ghana
Development charities based in the United States
Charities based in Oregon
Organizations established in 2006